James L. Edwards, Ph.D, is the former president of the Anderson University, a position he had held since July 1, 1990, and the former president of the Anderson School of Theology.

Biography

Education
Dr. Edwards completed his bachelor's and master's degree from Anderson University and the Anderson University School of Theology. In 1987, he went on to receive his Doctor of Philosophy in Educational Policy and Leadership from Ohio State University. His dissertation was titled Connections: Things That Matter to Teachers in Small Colleges. While completing his doctoral studies, he received the Earl W. Anderson Award for Research in Higher Education from Ohio State’s College of Education.

President of Anderson University
Dr. Edwards became president of Anderson University on July 1, 1990. He was the fourth president in the university's history and also presided over the Anderson University School of Theology. President Edwards is commonly and popularly referred to as "P. Eddy" by the Anderson University students. This is from the abbreviation of the word "President" and the shortening of the name "Edwards." As of 2014, Edwards has officially announced that he is stepping down as president and will conclude by the end of the 2014-2015 academic year. His last year of service will mark 25 years.

References

Living people
Heads of universities and colleges in the United States
Year of birth missing (living people)
Ohio State University College of Education and Human Ecology alumni
Anderson University (Indiana) alumni